Mayumi Someya (染谷 真有美, Someya Mayumi, born 30 May 1993) is a Japanese karateka. At the 2018 World Karate Championships held in Madrid, Spain, she won the silver medal in the women's team kumite event. She represented Japan at the 2020 Summer Olympics in the women's 61 kg event.

Personal life
She is the younger sister of Kayo Someya, also a karateka and a colleague of Japan's national karate team.

Achievements

References

External links 
 

Living people
1993 births
Place of birth missing (living people)
Japanese female karateka
Karateka at the 2020 Summer Olympics
Olympic karateka of Japan
21st-century Japanese women